Matthew Rendell (born 18 April 1959 in South Australia) is a former Australian rules footballer who played in the Australian Football League and South Australian National Football League (SANFL).

Rendell played as a ruckman and made his debut with the West Torrens Football Club in the SANFL in 1977 where he played 79 games. He left South Australia in 1981 to play with the Fitzroy Football Club in the VFL, wearing the No. 9 guernsey. In his first year, he played mainly at full forward and kicked forty-five goals, but he admitted in later years he did not enjoy it. With the return of Ron Alexander to Western Australia, however, Rendell was to make the ruck position his own, barring injuries, until 1987. Rendell did have quite a number of injuries, however, after 1983, with the result that he played only 26 of 43 games in 1984 and 1985.

Rendell won Fitzroy's 1982 and 1983 best and fairest awards, and was appointed captain from 1985 to 1987. In one of the most remarkable games in V/AFL history, Rendell, who had not kicked a goal in his previous seventeen games for Fitzroy, was used as a seventh forward to counter North Melbourne's Gary Dempsey's habit of marking in the last line resulting in Rendell kicked eight goals and the Lions winning the game by 150 points, which at the time more than doubled the previous biggest loss by a minor premier.

Rendell played just one game with the Lions in 1988, the rest of the year spent in the reserves, which Rendell put down to a misunderstanding with coach David Parkin. He played 18 games in 1989 and played well enough throughout the season to secure four Brownlow votes in a drive to the finals that was deflated by an injury to top forward Richard Osborne.

He retired at the end of 1991 after 164 games and 101 goals with Fitzroy. However he soon reversed that decision and moved to the Brisbane Bears, who persuaded him to continue playing. He did so in his final year in 1992, playing 13 games and booting 7 goals for the Bears before retiring for good.

Rendell was an assistant coach and match-day tactician with the St Kilda Football Club alongside Grant Thomas, until he was sacked at the end of 2006 with the appointment of Ross Lyon.  In 2007 he returned to South Australia, joining the Adelaide Football Club as their recruitment manager. Rendell resigned as Adelaide's recruiting manager on 16 March 2012 following issues around reported comments in relation to the recruitment of Australian Aborigines.  He was later, with the AFL's permission, hired by Collingwood as part of their recruiting department.  In 2015 he also took up the part-time task of coaching Collingwood's ruckmen.

Rendell's brother Tim was a promising ruckman who also played for West Torrens and was recruited by Fitzroy but did not play a game due to chronic injury.

References

Australian rules footballers from South Australia
Fitzroy Football Club players
Brisbane Bears players
1959 births
Living people
West Torrens Football Club players
Mitchell Medal winners
All-Australians (1953–1988)
South Australian State of Origin players